Svitlana Bondarenko (born 12 August 1971 in Zaporizhzhia) is a former international breaststroke swimmer from Ukraine. She swam at three Olympics (1996, 2000 and 2004), multiple World Championships and European Championships, and several other meets during her international career from 1991 to 2010.

In the 1990s, she was the silver-medalist in the 100 Breaststroke at every European Championships (1991, 1993, 1995, 1997 and 1999), and also won silver in the 200 Breaststroke in 1995. At the 1995 Short Course Worlds, she garnered silver medals in both breaststroke events (100 and 200).

In the 2000s, at the 2004 European Championships, she won the 100 Breaststroke.

Bondarenko was the oldest contender at the 2010 European Championships.

References

External links
 

1971 births
Living people
Ukrainian female swimmers
Female breaststroke swimmers
Olympic swimmers of Ukraine
Swimmers at the 1996 Summer Olympics
Swimmers at the 2000 Summer Olympics
Swimmers at the 2004 Summer Olympics
Sportspeople from Zaporizhzhia
Medalists at the FINA World Swimming Championships (25 m)
European Aquatics Championships medalists in swimming
Universiade medalists in swimming
Universiade gold medalists for Ukraine
Universiade silver medalists for Ukraine
Competitors at the 1993 Summer Universiade
Medalists at the 1997 Summer Universiade